The Beverly Hillbillies is an American sitcom that aired on CBS from September 26, 1962, to March 23, 1971. Originally filmed in black and white for the first three seasons (1962-1965), the first color-filmed episode ("Admiral Jed Clampett") was aired on September 15, 1965, and all subsequent episodes from 1965 to 1971 were filmed in color. During its nine-season run, 274 episodes aired—106 in black-and-white, 168 in color. In its first two seasons, The Beverly Hillbillies was the #1 television program.

Series overview

Episodes

Season 1 (1962–63) 
All episodes in black-and-white

Season 2 (1963–64) 
All episodes in black-and-white

Season 3 (1964–65) 
All episodes in black-and-white

Season 4 (1965–66)   
All episodes from Season 4 onwards now filmed in color

Season 5 (1966–67)

Season 6 (1967–68)

Season 7 (1968–69)

Season 8 (1969–70)

Season 9 (1970–71)

See also 
 List of Green Acres episodes
 List of Petticoat Junction episodes

References 

Lists of American sitcom episodes
Episodes